Pseudophilautus newtonjayawardanei (Newton Jayawardanei's shrub frog) is a species of frogs in the family Rhacophoridae, endemic to Sri Lanka.

Its natural habitats are wet lowland forests of Sri Lanka. It is threatened by habitat loss. It is one of the 8 species of rhacophorids that was discovered from Adam's Peak recently.

Etymology
The frog was named after Dr. Newton Jayawardane, a surgeon and a wildlife conservationist.

Description
This frog has a dark brown cross band between eyes. The body is bronze brown in color.

References

newtonjayawardanei
Endemic fauna of Sri Lanka
Frogs of Sri Lanka
Amphibians described in 2013